Rosana Ferreira de Aleluia (born 2 January 1970) is a Brazilian former handball player. She competed in the women's tournament at the 2000 Summer Olympics.

References

External links
 

1970 births
Living people
Brazilian female handball players
Olympic handball players of Brazil
Handball players at the 2000 Summer Olympics
Sportspeople from Salvador, Bahia
Pan American Games medalists in handball
Pan American Games gold medalists for Brazil
Pan American Games bronze medalists for Brazil
Handball players at the 1999 Pan American Games
Medalists at the 1995 Pan American Games
Medalists at the 1999 Pan American Games
21st-century Brazilian women